Miguel Ángel Zepeda Espinoza (born 25 May 1976) is a Mexican former professional footballer who played as a midfielder.

Career 
Zepeda made his professional debut on November 13, 1996, in 2–2 draw against Chivas. He has played most of his career with Atlas, from 1996 to 2001. In the Invierno 2001 he transferred to Cruz Azul. With Cruz Azul Zepeda spent 4 short tournaments. In the 2003 Apertura Zepeda transferred to Monarcas Morelia, where he did not have any success. In the 2004 Clausura Zepeda he transferred to Toluca, where Toluca got eliminated in the semifinals by Guadalajara. Zepeda went back with Cruz Azul for two more seasons (Apertura 2004), (Clausura 2005). He later transferred to Santos Laguna, but he did not have much success, so he transferred to America. With Club América he only played in five games and did not score any goals, but won the 2006 CONCACAF Cup. Zepeda transferred to San Luis for the 2006 Apertura, where once again he did not have much success. After two years without playing professionally he's playing again for Atlas.
Since his return to F.C Atlas Zepeda struggled during his first season, but after regaining his form. Due to differences between Zepeda and the Atlas institucion, Zepeda was separated from the team mid-season.

International career
Zepeda has played with the Mexico national team; his debut was in February 1999 against Argentina. He was part of the squad that won the Confederations Cup 1999 in which he scored two goals in the final against Brazil, thus making 2 goals in the entire tournament.

Career statistics

International goals

|- 
| 1. || July 17, 1999 || Estadio Defensores del Chaco, Asunción, Paraguay ||  || 2–1 || 2–1 || 1999 Copa América
|- 
| 2. || August 4, 1999 || Estadio Azteca, Mexico City, Mexico ||  || 1–0 || 4–3 || 1999 FIFA Confederations Cup
|-
| 3. || August 4, 1999 || Estadio Azteca, Mexico City, Mexico ||  || 3–2 || 4–3 || 1999 FIFA Confederations Cup
|-
| 4. || February 5, 2000 || Hong Kong Stadium, Wan Chai, Hong Kong ||  || 1–0 || 1–0 || 2000 Carlsberg Cup
|- 
| 5. || February 8, 2000 || Hong Kong Stadium, Wan Chai, Hong Kong ||  || 1–2 || 1–2 || 2000 Carlsberg Cup
|-
| 6. || July 5, 2000 || Estadio Tecnológico, Monterrey, Mexico ||  || 1–1 || 2–1 || Friendly
|- 
| 7. || July 16, 2000 || Estadio Rommel Fernández, Panama City, Panama ||  || 1–0 || 1–0 || 2002 FIFA World Cup qualification
|-
| 8. || September 3, 2000 || Estadio Azteca, Mexico City, Mexico ||  || 3–0 || 7–1 || 2002 FIFA World Cup qualification
|}

Honours
Mexico
FIFA Confederations Cup: 1999
CONCACAF Gold Cup: 2003

References

External links
 
 
 Informador.com.mx

1976 births
Living people
Atlas F.C. footballers
Cruz Azul footballers
Santos Laguna footballers
Atlético Morelia players
Deportivo Toluca F.C. players
Club América footballers
Leones Negros UdeG footballers
C.D. Veracruz footballers
San Luis F.C. players
Liga MX players
Footballers from Nayarit
People from Tepic
Mexico international footballers
CONCACAF Gold Cup-winning players
1999 FIFA Confederations Cup players
1999 Copa América players
2001 Copa América players
2003 CONCACAF Gold Cup players
FIFA Confederations Cup-winning players
Mexican footballers
Association football midfielders